Salvage may refer to:

 Marine salvage, the process of rescuing a ship, its cargo and sometimes the crew from peril
 Water salvage,  rescuing people from floods.
 Salvage tug, a type of tugboat used to rescue or salvage ships which are in distress or in danger of sinking
 Recycling, the conversion of waste materials into new materials and objects, was usually referred to in the mid-20th century as "salvage"
 Salvage for Victory, a US Government campaign to salvage materials for the American war effort in World War II
 Paper Salvage 1939–50, a British government campaign to encourage the recycling of paper, initially to aid the war effort
 Data salvage, the process of data recovery from damaged, failed, corrupted, or inaccessible primary storage media
 Salvage archaeology, an archaeological survey and excavation carried out in areas threatened by construction or development
 Salvage ethnography, the practice of salvaging a record of what was left of a culture before it disappeared
 Salvage therapy, medical treatment for those patients not responding adequately to first line treatment

In business

 Waste sorting
 Salvage value, the estimated value of an asset at the end of its useful life

In entertainment

 Salvage (1921 film), a 1921 American silent film directed by Henry King
 Salvage (2006 film), a 2006 American horror film
 Salvage (2009 film), a 2009 British horror film
 "Salvage", an episode of Alfred Hitchcock Presents
 Salvage 1, a 1979 ABC science fiction-comedy series
 "Salvage" (The X-Files), a 2001 episode of the television series The X-Files
 "Salvage" (Angel), a 2003 episode of the television series Angel
 Salvage, a 1962 episode in the Hallmark Hall of Fame
 Salvage (Transformers), an Autobot from Transformers
 "Salvage" (short story), a 1986 short story by Orson Scott Card
 Salvage, a 1919 novel by Mary Roberts Rinehart

Other
 Salvage, Newfoundland and Labrador, Canada
 Extrajudicial punishment resulting in death is referred to as Salvage in the Philippines
 Salvage title, a form of vehicle title branding in North America

See also
 Lifesaving
 Selvage (disambiguation)
 Wrecking (shipwreck)